This is a timeline documenting events of Jazz in the year 1963.

Events

May
 15 – The 5th Annual Grammy Awards were held in Chicago, Los Angeles and New York.
 Ella Fitzgerald awarded Best Solo Vocal Performance, Female for Ella Swings Brightly with Nelson
Stan Getz awarded Best Jazz Performance – Soloist Or Small Group (Instrumental) for "Desafinado"
Stan Kenton awarded Best Jazz Performance – Large Group (Instrumental) for Adventures In Jazz
Vince Guaraldi awarded Best Original Jazz Composition for the composition "Cast Your Fate to the Wind" performed by the Vince Guaraldi Trio

July
 4 – The 10th Newport Jazz Festival started in Newport, Rhode Island (July 4 – 7).

Album releases

Chris Barber: "Chris Barber at the BBC" with Joe Harriott and Ottilie Patterson
Art Blakey and the Jazz Messengers
Caravan
Buhaina's Delight
Ugetsu
Kenny Burrell: Midnight Blue
Betty Carter: 'Round Midnight
Miles Davis: Seven Steps to Heaven
Eric Dolphy: Iron Man (recorded, released 1968)
Duke Ellington
Money Jungle with Charles Mingus and Max Roach 
My People
The Symphonic Ellington
Bill Evans: Conversations with Myself
Joe Harriott: Movement
Joe Henderson: Page One
Sheila Jordan: Portrait of Sheila
Stan Kenton: Artistry in Bossa Nova
Charles Mingus: The Black Saint and the Sinner Lady
Hank Mobley: No Room for Squares
Thelonious Monk: Criss Cross
Thelonious Monk: Monk's Dream
Prince Lasha Quintet Featuring Sonny Simmons: The Cry!
Sun Ra: Cosmic Tones For Mental Therapy (recorded, released 1967)
Sonny Rollins: Our Man in Jazz
Nina Simone: Nina Simone Sings Ellington
Stanley Turrentine: Soul Shoutin'
Kai Winding: Solo: Kai Winding

Standards

Deaths

 January
 13 – Sonny Clark, American pianist (born 1931).
 16 – Ike Quebec, American tenor saxophonist (born 1918).

 February
 6 – Specs Wright, American drummer (born 1927).
 14 – Castor McCord, American saxophonist (born 1907).
 16 – Jimmy Reynolds, American pianist (born 1904).
 20 – Addison Farmer, American bassist (born 1928).
 23 – June Clark, American trumpeter and cornetist (born 1900).
 28 – Bobby Jaspar, Belgian saxophonist, flautist, and composer (born 1926).

 March
 10 – Irving Aaronson, American pianist and big band leader (born 1895).
 17 – Lizzie Miles, Creole blues singer (born 1895).

 April
 3 – Gene Sedric, American clarinetist and tenor saxophonist (born 1907).
 9 – Eddie Edwards, American trombonist (born 1891).
 11 – Arvid Gram Paulsen, Norwegian saxophonist and trumpeter (born 1922).
 12 – Herbie Nichols, American pianist and composer (born 1919).

 May
 24 – Elmore James, American guitarist (born 1918).

 June
 3 – Skinnay Ennis, American bandleader and singer (born 1907).
 12 – Bob Scobey, American trumpeter (born 1916).

 July
 25 – John Adriano Acea, American jazz pianist (born 1917).
 31 – Curtis Counce, American upright bassist (born 1926).

 August
 23 – Glen Gray, American saxophonist, Casa Loma Orchestra (born 1906).

 September
 20 – Pete Brown, American alto saxophonist and bandleader (born 1906).
 Sam Allen, American pianist (born 1909).

 November
 4 – Joe Gordon, American trumpeter (born 1928).
 29 – Ernesto Lecuona, Cuban composer, pianist and bandleader (born 1895).

 December
 14
 Dinah Washington, American singer (born 1924).
 Lodewijk Parisius "Kid Dynamite", Surinamese-Dutch tenor saxophonist (born 1911).
 22 – Roy Palmer, American trombonist (born 1892).

 Unknown date
 Jon Ballantyne, Canadian pianist and composer.
 Naftule Brandwein, Jewish clarinetist and influential klezmer musician (born 1884).

Births

 January
 7 – Christine Tobin, Irish vocalist and composer.
 17 – Cyrus Chestnut, American pianist, songwriter and producer.

 February
 2
 Eva Cassidy, American singer and guitarist (died 1996).
 Vigleik Storaas, Norwegian pianist.
 5 – Jacqui Dankworth, British singer.

 March
 5 – Ralph Alessi, American trumpeters and composer.
 18 – Yoko Kanno, Japanese composer, arranger, keyboarder, pianist, and accordionist.
 23 – Nelson Faria, Brazilian guitarist.
 24
 Dave Douglas, American trumpeter and composer.
 Eric Vloeimans, Dutch trumpeter.
 30 – Ximo Tebar, Spanish guitarist and composer.

 April
 1 – Antoine Roney, American saxophonist.
 4 – Benny Green, American pianist.
 7 – Fredrik Lundin, Danish saxophonist, composer, and bandleader.
 8 – Tine Asmundsen, Norwegian upright bassist.
 17 – Peter Havlicek, Austrian kontragitarrist (viennese harp-guitar), guitarist, composer, and vocalist.
 24 – Horacio "El Negro" Hernandez, Cuban drummer and percussionist.

 May
 2 – Eric Person, American saxophonist.
 4 – Gerald Cleaver, American drummer.
 9 – Ron Miles, American trumpeter, cornetist, and composer.
 4 – Jack Cooper, American composer, arranger, multireedist, and music educator.
 16 – Nikki Iles, English composer, pianist and accordion player.
 27 – Gonzalo Rubalcaba, Afro-Cuban composer and pianist.
 28 – Marc Antoine, French guitarist.

 June
 9 – Gilad Atzmon, British saxophonist and writer.
 20 – Jeff Beal, American trumpeter, flugelhornist, keyboarder, and composer.
 28 – Tierney Sutton, American singer.

 July
 5 – Russ Lorenson, American singer and actor.
 23 – Renato Borghetti, Brazilian folk musician and composer.

 August
 7 – Marcus Roberts, American pianist.
 10 – Christine Ott, French composer, pianist, vocalist, and multi-instrumentalist.
 12
 Karen Briggs, African-American violinist.
 Nigel Mooney, Irish singer, guitarist, and songwriter.
 23 – Stephanie Biddle, Canadian musician.
 31 – Baard Slagsvold, Norwegian singer and multi-instrumentalist.

 September
 2 – Sherrie Maricle, American drummer.
 6 – Thulla Christina Wamberg, Danish singer.

 October
 3 – Niels Lan Doky, Danish pianist and record producer.

 November
 1 – Martin Pizzarelli, American upright bassist.
 2 – Jens Johansson, Swedish pianist and keyboarder.
 8 – Russell Malone, American guitarist.
 16 – Steve Argüelles, English drummer.
 20 – Don Braden, American tenor saxophonist.
 24
 Scott Colley, American upright bassist and composer.
 Yoron Israel, American drummer.
 25
 Anders Widmark, Swedish pianist and composer.
 Holly Cole, Canadian singer.

 December
 10 – Ole Amund Gjersvik, Norwegian upright bassist.
 14 – Dalia Faitelson, Israeli composer, vocalist, guitarist, and DJ DaFa.
 29 – Dave McKean, English photographer, graphic designer, filmmaker, and pianist.

 Unknown date
 Bill Wells, Scottish bassist, pianist, guitarist, and composer.
 Don Paterson, Scottish poet, writer, and musician.
 Gianni Lenoci, Italian pianist and composer.
 Torcuato Mariano, Argentinian-born American guitarist.

See also

 1960s in jazz
 List of years in jazz
 1963 in music

References

Bibliography

External links 
 History Of Jazz Timeline: 1963 at All About Jazz

Jazz
Jazz by year